Gjinar is a village and a former municipality in the Elbasan County, central Albania. At the 2015 local government reform it became a subdivision of the municipality Elbasan. The population at the 2011 census was 3,478. The municipal unit consists of the villages Lleshan, Gjinar, Valesh, Pashtresh, Derstile, Llukan, Sterstan, Xibresh, Maskarth, Kaferr and Pobrat. It is part of the Shpati mountainous area, and a touristic destination. It is near a massive pine forest. It is known for weekly bazaar days.

Every Thursday in center of Gjinar  takes place bazaar day. There you can buy fresh products from villages nearby that comes to sell products.

As a touristic center there can be enjoyed weekends in the fresh air, beautiful nature and can have  good meals in restaurants that are in area

References.

Former municipalities in Elbasan County
Administrative units of Elbasan
Villages in Elbasan County